Ørum is a small Danish town with a population of 1,420 (1 January 2022), on the road between Viborg and Randers.
To distinguish it from other places in Denmark, it is referred to as Ørum Sønderlyng or sometimes Ørum Tjele.

Ørum was the former municipal seat for Tjele Municipality. 
In 2007, it was merged with other municipalities into Viborg Municipality.

Notable people 
 Frank Hvam (born 1970) a Danish stand-up-comedian was born in Viborg and grew up on a farm in Ørum Sønderlyng

 Martin Hoberg Hedegaard or Saveus (born 1992) a Danish singer, songwriter and record producer

References

Cities and towns in the Central Denmark Region
Viborg Municipality